William Ross, a prominent producer and stage manager on Broadway, was born in New York City on 5 September 1915 and died 23 August 1994. He served as vice president of the Actors' Equity Association and the first president of the Stage Managers' Association. He was recipient of the Philip Loeb Humanitarian Award and the Paul Robeson Award for his work in racial integration of stage casting.

References

American theatre managers and producers
African-American people
1915 births
1994 deaths
20th-century American businesspeople
20th-century African-American people